Raasave Unnai Nambi is a 1988 Indian Tamil-language film, directed by T. K. Bose  and produced by Rajkiran. The film stars Ramarajan, Rekha, Poornam Viswanathan and Saritha. It was released on 10 March 1988, and ran for 100 days.

Plot
Malathi is a new teacher in a small town and stays in the house owned by Raja, another teacher at the school. Raja's older brother is an Army officer that everyone calls Pattalathan. He's well-respected in the town and is strict with anyone that attempts anything illegal or immoral. Vasu is a moonshiner that has had multiple run-ins with Pattalathan and nurses a grudge. His younger sister Ranjitham was in college with Raja. The two were in love but separate due to misunderstandings caused by their older brothers' clashes. Raja arranges for Malathi and Pattalathan to marry and the two are very happy together. Ranjitham's other brother Arunachalam, who ran away as a child, returns to town just as Pattalathan is deployed again. Malathi knew Arunachalam before she came to town and that prior relationship causes problems for the family. Things are exacerbated when Malathi learns that she is pregnant. The family tensions reach a critical juncture when Pattalathan returns to town.

Cast
Ramarajan as Raja
Rekha as Ranjitham
Saritha as Malathi
Radha Ravi as Pattalathan
Poornam Viswanathan as Doctor
Malaysia Vasudevan as Vasu alias KD
Kallapetti Singaram as Singaram
Senthil as Azhagesan
Kovai Sarala as Mynavathi
Ilavarasan as Arunachalam
Suryakanth
S. S. Chandran
Disco Shanti
Usilai Mani as Veembu Veerasamy

Soundtrack
The music was composed by Ilaiyaraaja.

Reception
The Indian Express wrote, "The eyecaressing rural scenario and Ilayaraja's flutey music and songs are the saving grace whose style and manner remind you of films like Amman Koil Kizhakkale and Vaidehi Kaathirunthal. The contrivances of the plot set the clocks decades back". Susheela won in the Best Female Playback Singer category at the 9th Cinema Express Awards.

References

External links
 

1980s Tamil-language films
1988 films
Films scored by Ilaiyaraaja